Julie Kilpatrick (born 22 August 1983 in Glasgow) is a female field hockey player from Scotland. She plays in midfield and defence, and made her debut for the Women's National Team in 2003. Kilpatrick is engaged to Scottish and GB international hockey player, David Mitchell.

References
 sportscotland

1983 births
Living people
Scottish female field hockey players
Field hockey players at the 2006 Commonwealth Games
Field hockey players from Glasgow
Commonwealth Games competitors for Scotland